Monastery station was a VIA Rail station in Monastery, Nova Scotia. 

The station was operated by Canadian National Railway and later by VIA Rail, but has not been served by passenger trains since 1990.

References 

Buildings and structures in Antigonish County, Nova Scotia
Transport in Antigonish County, Nova Scotia
Via Rail stations in Nova Scotia
Disused railway stations in Canada